Aisha al-Hurra, generally known under her Spanish name Aixa (fl. 1493), was the spouse of Muhammed XI and of Abu l-Hasan Ali, and the mother of Muhammad XII. Aixa was also known by the Muslims as Aisha al-Horra; "al-Horra" being a noble title (meaning "Free Woman") due to the fact that she was one of the living descendants of Muhammed. She was politically active and exerted influence upon the policy of state during the last years of the Emirate of Granada. Aixa is one of the best known women of the history of the Emirate of Granada.

Life
Aixa was born a member of the ruling Nasrid dynasty of Granada, likely the daughter of Muhammed IX. She personally owned several palaces and properties. Aixa was first married to Muhammed XI; after his death in 1455, she was married by his successor Said to his heir, Abu l-Hasan Ali. Her second marriage was likely an attempt to make peace between the rival factions of the dynasty. Aixa was exiled to another palace with her sons after her spouse fell in love with his Christian slave Isabel de Solís and married her.

In 1482, Aixa allied herself with the opposition party Abencerrages and had her husband deposed in favour of her son. 
Aixa was politically active during the reign of her son Muhammed XII, also known as Boabdil. She is said to have prevented harassment of the Christians in Granada. In 1483, she handled the negotiations for the release of her son, who had been taken captive by Castile. 
Aixa was known to be an extreme patriot, since she wanted to continue to fight to the death using women, children, and old men, even though the army of Granada was defeated by Ferdinand and Isabella of Castile and Aragon. She blamed the defeat on traitors in the kingdom who allowed themselves to betray their country for large sums of money and property if they would convince their king to surrender the Kingdom of Granada.

After the fall of Granada in 1492, she followed her son into exile—first to Alpujarras, and in 1493 to Fes.

A famous legend says that when her deposed son Muhammad XII left Granada after its fall, he looked back upon it and sighed. Aixa then replied:

"Weep like a woman for a kingdom you could not defend like a man."

ابك اليوم بكاء النساء على ملك لم تحفظه حفظ الرجال

Ibki l-yawma bukā'a n-nisā'i ʿalā mulkin lam taḥfaẓhu ḥifẓa r-rijāl

See also 

 Dar al-Horra

Bibliography

 Dolores Mirón, Universidad de Granada, Andalucía Comunidad Cultural, Biografías de Mujeres Andaluzas Aixa
 Carpeta Didáctica : al-Andalus Al-Ándalus III: el Sultanato De Granada (1232-1492) y Una Breve Reseña Sobre la Alhambra
 R.H. Shamsuddín Elía, Historia de Al-Andalus, Boletín N° 53 -08/2006 Al-Ándalus III: El Sultanato De Granada (1232-1492)
 Nicolás Homar Vives, Reyes y Reinos Genealogias, Granada
 Washington Irving, The Alhambra version sur Internet en anglais de Tales of the Alhambra, Ed. Padre Suarez, Granada, 1953. Traduction en français : Washington Irving, Contes de l'Alhambra, Ed. Phebus, Collection Domaine Romanesque, 1998, ou Collection Libretto, 2004,

Nasrid dynasty
15th-century people from al-Andalus
15th-century Arabs
People of the Reconquista
People from Granada
Year of birth unknown
Year of death unknown
Women of the Emirate of Granada
Spouses of sultans